Abrazo de Maipú is a refuge located on the Trinity Peninsula of the Antarctic Peninsula.

It was built for the first time on September 7, 1967, by Argentina and subsequently destroyed. The refuge, rebuilt in July 2003, is a 20 cubic feet container fitted with kitchen, bathroom and bedrooms.
Its aim was to guarantee and facilitate rescue, scientific and patrolling activities carried out jointly by the personnel of O'Higgins Base and Esperanza Base. It was managed jointly by the Chilean Army and the Argentine Army.

On September 28, 2005 three Chilean soldiers died falling into a crevasse, they were moved from the Abrazo de Maipú refuge to the O'Higgins Base. The Refuge was closed in 2010.

See also
 List of Antarctic research stations
 List of Antarctic field camps

References

External links
 Dirección Nacional del Antártico
 Official website Instituto Antártico Chileno

Outposts of Antarctica
Chilean Antarctic Territory
Argentine Antarctica